The list of ship commissionings in 2001 includes a chronological list of all ships commissioned in 2001.


See also 

2001
 Ship commissionings